Mousa Hussein Kraish (born November 21) is an American actor and director, who has appeared in several Hollywood films including Steven Spielberg's 2005 film Munich. He is best known for his role as the Jinn in American Gods.

Biography

Kraish was born and raised in a Palestinian family in the Bay Ridge section of Brooklyn, New York. He is the oldest of nine children. He first studied to become a doctor, then switched to working for an internet company. After graduating from Brooklyn College he spent two and a half years studying theater at David Mamet's Atlantic Theater Company. In addition to appearing in numerous independent and Hollywood films in recent years, Kraish also performed on stage at the 2004 New York Fringe Festival and the 2005 Arab-American Comedy Festival. He currently resides in Los Angeles, California.

Filmography

Film

Television

as Writer/Director
 How To Make A Dollar Bill in Brooklyn
 A Brother's Love
 The Fourth Estate

References

External links

 Mousa Kraish on Alive Not Dead
 Podcast interview with Mousa Kraish at Actors Off

1975 births
Living people
Male actors from New York City
American people of Palestinian descent
Brooklyn College alumni
American LGBT rights activists
American people of Arab descent